The Compacts of Basel, also known as Basel Compacts or Compactata, was an agreement between the Council of Basel and the moderate Hussites (or Utraquists), which was ratified by the Estates of Bohemia and Moravia in Jihlava on 5 July 1436. The agreement authorized Hussite priests to administer the sacramental wine to laymen during the Eucharist. The Council of Basel ratified the document on 15 January 1437, but it acknowledged that the communion under both kinds was not heretical only on 23 December.

References

Sources 

 
 
 
 

Hussite history
1436 in Europe